Pseudoarmillariella is a genus of fungi in the family Hygrophoraceae. The genus contains three species found in Central America, North America, and Asia. Pseudoarmillariella was described by mycologist Rolf Singer in 1956.

See also

List of Agaricales genera

References

Agaricales genera
Hygrophoraceae
Taxa named by Rolf Singer